Cyriopagopus albostriatus, commonly known as Thailand zebra leg tarantula (also Thailand black velvet tarantula or Thailand earth tiger), is a species of spider in the family Theraphosidae, found in Myanmar, Thailand, and Cambodia.

Name 
Its name comes from the Latin prefix albo, meaning white, and the Latin word , meaning lines or striped.

Description 
It is a moderately large fossorial species, which spends most of its time in a burrow. 

This species has white stripes going down each leg, and a white zig-zag pattern on its opisthosoma (abdomen). These patterns on a black background have earned it the common name Thai zebra tarantula. This tarantula is very skittish and defensive, and it can also be very aggressive. It is an Old World tarantula, so has no urticating hairs; its only defenses are biting and fleeing. This tarantula is known to have more potent venom than many tarantula species.

As food 
Cyriopagopus albostriatus is edible and used as food. When fried, these spiders are sold on the streets of Cambodia. Cooked correctly, C. albostriatus is high in protein.

References

Theraphosidae
Spiders of Asia
Spiders described in 1886
Edible spiders